The Asa M. Cook House is a historic house in Reading, Massachusetts.  The -story wood-frame Second Empire house was built in 1872 for Asa M. Cook, an American Civil War veteran who commuted by train to a job at the United States custom house in Boston.  The house is one of the most elaborately detailed of the style in Reading, with pedimented windows, rope-edge corner boards, and dormers with cut-out decoration in the mansard roof.

The house was added to the National Register of Historic Places in 1984.

See also
National Register of Historic Places listings in Reading, Massachusetts
National Register of Historic Places listings in Middlesex County, Massachusetts
1st Massachusetts Battery - unit commanded by Cook
8th Massachusetts Battery - unit commanded by Cook

References

Houses on the National Register of Historic Places in Reading, Massachusetts
Houses in Reading, Massachusetts
1872 establishments in Massachusetts
Houses completed in 1872
Second Empire architecture in Massachusetts